Gasiba (stands for Gabungan Sepakbola Indonesia Bulukumba) is an Indonesian football club based in Bulukumba Mini Stadium, Bulukumba Regency, South Sulawesi. This team competes in Liga 3 South Sulawesi Zone.

References

External links

Bulukumba Regency
Football clubs in Indonesia
Football clubs in South Sulawesi